HMS E37 was a British E class submarine built by Fairfield, Govan, Clyde. She was launched on 2 September 1915 and commissioned on 17 March 1916. E37 was lost in the North Sea on 1 December 1916. There were no survivors.

Design
She was powered by two  Vickers eight-cylinder two-stroke diesel engines and two  electric motors.

E37 was armed with a 12-pounder  QF gun mounted forward of the conning tower. She had five 18 inch (450 mm) torpedo tubes, two in the bow, one either side amidships, and one in the stern; a total of 10 torpedoes were carried.

E-Class submarines had wireless systems with  power ratings; in some submarines, these were later upgraded to  systems by removing a midship torpedo tube. Their maximum design depth was  although in service some reached depths of below . Some submarines contained Fessenden oscillator systems.

Crew
Her complement was three officers and 28 men.

References

Bibliography

External links
 'Submarine losses 1904 to present day' - Royal Navy Submarine Museum 

 

British E-class submarines of the Royal Navy
Ships built in Govan
1915 ships
World War I submarines of the United Kingdom
World War I shipwrecks in the North Sea
Royal Navy ship names
Maritime incidents in 1916